Petar Bergamo (Muć near Split, 27 February 1930 – Zagreb, 4 September 2022) was a Yugoslav composer.

Bergamo was born in Muć near Split, Croatia, then Kingdom of Yugoslavia. He graduated from the Belgrade Music Academy in 1960, where he studied composition with Stanojlo Rajičić and conducting with Živojin Zdravković. He also completed his post-graduate studies of composition at the same academy (1964) and was an assistant and assistant professor of composition and instrumentation from 1965 to 1972. His students included Mirjana Sistek-Djordjevic. From 1973 to 1976 he was a music editor at Universal Edition in Vienna.

Bergamo
wrote two symphonies, works for chorus, children’s songs, film scores, and
incidental music for radio. His early music is in a late-Romantic style, while his
later works show increasing tendencies toward atonality and freedom from
traditional forms.
Bergamo’s works for winds include: Concerto Abbreviato for clarinet solo, I colori d’argento for flute,
harpsichord and chamber ensemble (1967), Concerto per una voce for bassoon
(1975), Saxophone Concerto (1991–1993), and Domande senza ripostà for saxophone and piano (1996). He lived with his wife in Belgrade.

References

Blagojevic, Andrija. "Jeunesses Musicales International Competition in Belgrade, Serbia."  The Clarinet, Vol. 39/4 (September 2012), pp. 78–84.
Biography at the website of Croatian Composers Society, Retrieved on April 17, 2016
Kompozicije Petra Bergama, Radio Belgrade 3, November 16, 2012
LP 22-2528 STEREO, Produkcija gramofonskih ploča Radio-televizije Beograd, Beograd
Odom, D. (2005): A Catalog of Compositions for Unaccompanied Clarinet Published Between 1978 and 1982 with an Annotated Bibliography of Selected Works, A treatise submitted to the College of Music, Florida State University
Peričić, V. [1969]: Muzički stvaraoci u Srbiji, Prosveta, Beograd
Petar Bergamo's works at IMDb, Retrieved on October 5, 2011
Petar Bergamo at Matica hrvatska, Retrieved on October 5, 2011
Simonović-Schiff, J.: Petar Bergamo’s symphonic compositions: Perspectives of the 1960s and 1990s , Muzikologija 2004 Volume , Issue 4, Pp: 197-222

Serbian composers
Academic staff of the University of Arts in Belgrade
1930 births
2022 deaths
Musicians from Split, Croatia
Vladimir Nazor Award winners
University of Arts in Belgrade alumni
Serbs of Croatia
Yugoslav composers
20th-century Serbian people
Burials at Lovrinac Cemetery